Leonard Franciszek Piątek (born Leonard Franz Piontek, 3 October 1913 – 1 July 1967) was a Polish footballer who played as a forward in the interwar period. In the spring of 1937 he changed his name to Leonard Franciszek Piątek (a Polonized version).

A hard-working and ambitious forward, Piątek was the top scorer for Polish first division vice-champions AKS Chorzów in 1937 and went on to lead the league the following season with 21 goals.

He represented the Polish national side on 16 occasions between 1937 and 1939, scoring 11 goals. He scored twice in Poland's 4–0 win over Yugoslavia in a World Cup qualifier and took part in the legendary 1938 FIFA World Cup match against Brazil in (Strasbourg, France on 5 June 1938, which Brazil won 6–5. Piątek also scored a goal in the last international match played in Poland before the outbreak of World War II, a 4–2 victory over Hungary on 27 August 1939.

Piątek signed the Volksliste (German Nationality List) after the Nazi invasion of Poland during World War II which allowed him to continue his footballing career. His club AKS Chorzów was now playing as Germania Königshütte and with Piątek as their key player the team dominated the first division Gauliga Schlesien – part of the German football league system – throughout the early 1940s far outperforming state-supported rivals 1. FC Katowice.

After war he played at AKS Chorzów until the end of the 1947–season, and moved to Pogoń Katowice, where he played from 1947 until 1950.

References

See also
 Polish Roster in World Cup Soccer France 1938

1913 births
1967 deaths
People from Chorzów
Polish footballers
Association football forwards
1938 FIFA World Cup players
People from the Province of Silesia
Poland international footballers
Sportspeople from Silesian Voivodeship
Volksdeutsche